New Caledonia competed at the 2011 Pacific Games in Nouméa between August 27 and September 10, 2011 as host nation. As of June 28, 2011 New Caledonia has listed 747 competitors.

Archery

New Caledonia has qualified 10 athletes.

Men
Laurent Clerte
Bruno Lau
Henry Shiu
Anthony Clerte
Clement Bonneterre
Gregoire Daniel

Women
Emmanuelle Guihard
Isabelle Dussol
Isabelle Soero
Sylvana Plazanet

Athletics

New Caledonia has qualified 65 athletes.

Men
David Alexandrine -  4 × 100 m Relay
Alexandre Aubert
Nordine Benfodda -  5000m,  10000m
Paolo Biondo
Max Boere
Erwan Cassier -  Hammer Throw
Thierry Cibone -  Shot Put Parasport Seated
Marvin Delaunay-Belleville
Frederic Erin -  Long Jump,  Triple Jump,  4 × 100 m Relay
Henry Fakatika
Xavier Fenuafanote -  110m Hurdles
Lilian Garcon -  Decathlon
Rene Grail
Jean-Bernard Harper -  Pole Vault
Jacky Hautaulu
Olivier Hnassil
Laurent Honore -  Pole Vault
Theo Houdret -  3000m Steeplechase
Alain Jeremie
Adrien Kela -  800m,  1500m
Daniel Kilama
Frederic Kiteau -  Discus Throw
Marc Koe
Christopher Leroy -  110m Hurdles
Audric Lucini -  5000m
Christopher Makatuki
Cedric Oblet -  1500m
Georgy Outurau
Kainric Ozoux -  100m,  Triple Jump,  4 × 100 m Relay
Thomas Prono -  10000m
Eric Reuillard -  Pole Vault,  Decathlon
Ogun Robert -  High Jump
Pasilione Tafilagi -  Shot Put Parasport Seated
Jean Pierre Talatini -  Shot Put Parasport Seated
Sebastien Tessarolo
Tomasi Toto -  Hammer Throw
Eutesio Toto -  Hammer Throw
Patrick Vernay -  Marathon
Bertrand Vili -  Discus Throw
Thierry Washetine -  Javelin Throw Parasport Ambulent
Paul Zongo -  4 × 100 m Relay

Women
Anne Beaufils -  5000m,  10000m
Ifuja Chamoinri -  4 × 400 m Relay
Marie-Xaviere Delesalle
Leina Durand
Erika Ellis -  Marathon
Losa Fakate
Manuella Gavin -  Triple Jump
Odile Huan
Mondy Laigle -  Pole Vault,  4 × 400 m Relay
Aimee Mailetoga -  Shot Put
Isabelle Oblet -  10000m,  3000m Steeplechase
Peggy Paulmin -  4 × 400 m Relay
Bina Ramesh -  Discus Throw
Franceska Sauvageot -  4 × 100 m Relay
Linda Selui -  Javelin Throw
Elise Takosi -  Hammer Throw
Chloe Thavel
Henricka Thomo -  4 × 100 m Relay
Evelyne Tuitavake -  Shot Put Parasport Seated
Noemie Turaud
Lucie Turpin -  100m Hurdles,  Heptathlon,  Long Jump
Rose Vandegou -  Shot Put Parasport Seated
Phoebe Wejieme -  100m Hurdles,  4 × 100 m Relay,  4 × 400 m Relay
Kamen Zongo -  4 × 100 m Relay

Badminton

New Caledonia has qualified 9 athletes.

Men
William Jannic -  Mixed Double Tournament,  Mixed Team Tournament,  Single Tournament
Marc-Antonie Desaymoz -  Single Tournament,  Mixed Team Tournament,  Double Tournament,  Mixed Double Tournament
Fabien Kaddour -  Double Tournament,  Mixed Team Tournament
Arnaud-Claude Franzi -  Double Tournament,  Mixed Team Tournament,  Single Tournament
Sebastien Arias -  Mixed Team Tournament,  Double Tournament

Women
Cecile Kaddour -  Double Tournament,  Mixed Double Tournament,  Mixed Team Tournament
Johanne Kou -  Double Tournament,  Mixed Team Tournament,  Mixed Double Tournament,  Single Tournament
Valerie Sarengat -  Mixed Team Tournament,  Single Tournament,  Double Tournament
Melissa Sanmoestanom -  Double Tournament

Baseball

New Caledonia has qualified a team.  Each team can have a maximum of 20 athletes.

Men
Jacques Boucheron
Remi Couarraze
David Durand
Warren Guistel
Christophe Jahja
Jacques Levy
Brieuc Mallet
Bryan Roy
Herve Saint-Pol
James Selefen
Kevin Velayoudon
Boris Zavarsky
Gabriel Bador
Vincent Cassier
Franck Chatchueng
Sebastien Lepouriel
Philippe Levy
Matthieu Quinquis

Basketball

New Caledonia has qualified a men's and women's team.  Each team can consist of a maximum of 12 athletes

Men -  Team Tournament
Alexandre Ha-Ho
Beniela Adjouhgniope
Benjamin Hnawia
Benoit Weber
Emmanuel Soeria-Oumba
Jean Jacques Taufana
Jean-Christian Arnaud
Laurent Berniere
Raymond Weber
Rodrigue Tetainanuarii
Stephane Saminadin
Yann Mathelon

Women -  Team Tournament
Alexandra Morin
Audrey Guillou
Christelle Vautrin
Diana Moutry
Dominique Armand
Marie-Helene Trocas
Myriam Fenuafanote
Nathalie Gies
Rachelle Kabar
Wasselie Luepak
Yolande Luepak
Yolene Koteureu

Bodybuilding

New Caledonia has qualified 11 athletes.

Men
Taieb Brahim
Guillaume Bruneau
Philippe Carnicelli -  -80 kg
Roland Chodey
Melvin Fichter
Philippe Girard
Steeve Martin
Patrick Villemur

Women
Glenda Girard
Virginie Foucault -  -55 kg,  All Categories
Stephanie Quach -  55 kg and Over

Boxing

New Caledonia has qualified 7 athletes.

Men
Jean Harper -  -56 kg
Gyan Athale
Georges Waleku
Luke Hema -  -75 kg
Nicolas Dion -  -81 kg
Nicolas Bastien -  -91 kg
Jean Vai Tuisamoa -  91 kg and Over

Canoeing

New Caledonia has qualified 26 athletes.

Men
Michel Anton -  V6 500m,  V12 500m
Julien Katoa -  V6 500m,  V12 500m
Jerry Mihimana -  V6 500m,  V6 30 km,  V12 500m
Georgy Taero -  V6 500m,  V12 500m
Joseph Toi -  V6 500m,  V6 30 km,  V12 500m
Titouan Puyo -  V1 500m,  V1 15 km,  V6 500m,  V6 1500m,  V12 500m
Stephane Brunat -  V6 1500m,  V12 500m
Yann Clavel -  V6 1500m,  V6 30 km,  V12 500m
Fabien Larhantec -  V6 1500m,  V6 30 km,  V12 500m
Cyril Pito -  V6 1500m,  V12 500m
Frederic Tissot -  V6 1500m,  V12 500m
Laurent Parotu -  V12 500m
Kevin Harbulot -  V6 30 km
Nicolas Mathieu -  V6 30 km

Women
Elise Akilitoa -  V6 500m,  V6 20 km,  V12 500m
Helene Christophe -  V6 500m,  V6 1500m,  V12 500m
Christelle Gouzennes -  V6 500m,  V6 1500m,  V12 500m
Diani Rabah -  V6 500m,  V6 1500m,  V12 500m
Yollande Teharuru -  V6 500m,  V6 1500m,  V12 500m
Lovaina Tetuira -  V1 500m,  V1 10 km,  V6 500m,  V6 1500m,  V12 500m
Moetuarii Manate -  V6 1500m,  V6 20 km,  V12 500m
Marcy Barbou -  V6 20 km,  V12 500m
Isabelle Froud-Cornaille -  V6 20 km,  V12 500m
Cindy Hons -  V12 500m
Sandrine Taerea -  V6 20 km,  V12 500m
Claudine Teriinohorai -  V6 20 km,  V12 500m

Cricket

New Caledonia has qualified a team.  Each team can consist of a maximum of 15 athletes.

Men
Falaone Fuimaono
Yann Gastaldi
Nasalio Gatuhau
Emmanuel Katrawi
Laurent Onocia
Steeve Tchidopoane
Jean-Christ Midraia
Soane Folituu
Johnatan Lapacas
Noel Sinyeue
Mikaele Tuakoifenua
Wilfrid Fuimaono
Kalepo Folituu
Maletino Lagikula
Vitolio Fomeku

Football

New Caledonia has qualified a men's and women's team.  Each team can consist of a maximum of 21 athletes.

Men -  Team Tournament
Jean Yann Dounezek
Joel Wakanumune
Kenji Vendegou
Joris Gorendiawe
Cesar Lolohea
Dominique Wacelie
Patrick Qaeze
Marius Bako
Iamel Kabeu
Pierre Wajoka
Bertrand Kai
Michel Hmae
Andre Sinedo
Judikael Ixoee
Jacques Haeko
Rocky Nyikeine
Georges Bearune
Emile Bearune
Georges Gope-Fenepej
Dimitri Petemou
Arsene Boawe
Olivier Dokunengo
Jean Patrick Wakanumune

Women -  Team Tournament
Beatrice Toluafe
Glenda Jaine
Marie Wanakaija
Claire Kaemo
Marielle Haocas
Marilyse Lolo
Helene Waengene
Kamene Xowie
Christelle Wahnawe
Celine Xolawawa
Stephanie Pahoa
Cheyenne Dieuma
Madeleine Jaine
Audrey Sinem
Brenda Kenon
Marjorie Pouye
Kim Maguire
Aurelie Wahnapo
Charlotte Pelletier
Honorine Pouidja
Elodie Teinpoawi
Eva Wahio
Aurelie Lalie

Golf

New Caledonia has qualified 8 athletes.

Men
Hugo Denis -  Team Tournament,  Individual Tournament
Florian Gernier -  Individual Tournament,  Team Tournament
Jean-Max Ho -  Team Tournament
Adrien Peres -  Team Tournament,  Individual Tournament

Women
Mathilde Gloux Bauchet -  Team Tournament
Pricilla Gracia -  Team Tournament
Charlotte Navarro -  Individual Tournament,  Team Tournament
Ophelie Rague -  Team Tournament,  Individual Tournament

Judo

New Caledonia has qualified 23 athletes.

Men
Paul Dulac
Jean-Nicolas Faure
Jonathan Berger
Yohann Courtine
Jean-Francois Durand
Jerome Papai
Cedric Do
Cyril Chevalier
Abedias Trindade de Abreu
Larry Martin
Teva Gouriou
Anthony Tran
Philippe Vautrin
Stephane Courtine

Women
Severine Raze
Elodie Foeillet
Emeline Kaddour
Rosa Delots
Anais Gopea
Cyndi Rival
Raissa Miko
Vaea Chadfeau
Erika Song

Karate

New Caledonia has qualified 17 athletes.

Men
Kevin Tuiseka -  -67 kg
Frederic Roumagne -  84 kg and Over,  Team Kumite
Minh Dack -  Individual Kata
Jean-Emmanuel Faure -  -60 kg,  Team Kata,  Team Kumite
Kevyn Pognon -  -75 kg,  Team Kata,  Team Kumite
Arnaud Saturnin -  Team Kata
Mathieu Annonier -  -84 kg
Jean-Christophe Taumotekava -  Team Kumite,  Open
Jean-Paul Hmaloko -  Team Kumite

Women
Beatrice Ouassette -  Team Kumite,  -50 kg
Emilie Brizard
Alicia Bézier
Sirani Sadimoen
Germaine Ngaiohni -  -68 kg
Audrey Goddelin
Morane Vacher -  Team Kumite,  Open
Cindy Agamalu -  Team Kumite

Powerlifting

New Caledonia has qualified 8 athletes.

Men
Karyl Le Van G'non -  -66 kg
Yannick Tuifua
Fredo Lecren -  -93 kg
Thierry Siselo
Soakimi Falevalu

Women
Jacqueline Caco -  -52 kg
Stephanie Tiemonhou -  -57 kg
Lydie Tiemonhou -  -63 kg

Rugby Sevens

New Caledonia has qualified a men's and women's team.  Each team can consist of a maximum of 12 athletes.

Men
Joffrey Vaitanaki
Desire Takatai
Petelo Folautanoa
Marcel Kauma
Arnaud Abry
Teva Legras
Nicolas Pavlovski
Malesio Maituku
Freidy Totele
Teddy Grondin
Roy Wemama

Women
Djemila Ihmanang
Anne-Marie Waitreu
Elisabete Keletaona
Claire Hillaireau
Marie-Helene Wahnawe
Catherine Devillers
Brenda Siwoine
Yolaine Yengo
Bianca Nekotrotro
Wendy Mayat
Dorothee Pakaina
Victoire Homou

Sailing

New Caledonia has qualified 8 athletes.

Mathieu Frei -  Laser Men Team,  Laser Men
Malo Leseigneur -  Laser Men,  Laser Men Team
Gaela Marchal Piriou -  Laser Women Team
Priscilla Poaniewa -  Laser Women Team,  Laser Women
Remy Desbordes -  Mixed Hobie Cat,  Mixed Hobie Cat Team
Jerome Le Gal -  Mixed Hobie Cat,  Mixed Hobie Cat Team
Titouan Galea -  Mixed Hobie Cat Team
Enrick Obert -  Mixed Hobie Cat Team

Shooting

New Caledonia has qualified 4 athletes.

Yann Blanquet -  Single Barrel Team
Philippe Simoni -  Single Barrel Individual,  Point Score Team
Theodore Tein Weiawe -  Single Barrel Team,  Point Score Team
Warren Le Pironnec -  Single Barrel Team,  Point Score Individual,  Point Score Team

Squash

New Caledonia has qualified 10 athletes.

Men
Nicolas Massenet -  Team Tournament,  Double Tournament
Etienne Marziac -  Double Tournament,  Team Tournament
Laurent Guepy -  Single Tournament,  Double Tournament,  Team Tournament,  Mixed Double Tournament
Fabian Dinh -  Mixed Double Tournament,  Team Tournament,  Double Tournament
Julien Peraldi -  Team Tournament

Women
Christine Deneufbourg -  Single Tournament,  Team Tournament,  Double Tournament
Marie Pierre Leca -  Team Tournament
Cynthia Tahuhuterani -  Team Tournament,  Single Tournament,  Double Tournament
Sylvaine Durand -  Double Tournament,  Mixed Double Tournament,  Team Tournament
Vanessa Quach -  Double Tournament,  Team Tournament,  Mixed Double Tournament,  Single Tournament

Surfing

New Caledonia has qualified 11 athletes.

Men
Rémy Darkis -  Mixed Longboard
Antoine David
Jordan David -  Surf
Rodrigue Kirsch
Thierry Kirsch
Martin N'Guyen
Baptiste Rabut

Women
Jenna Cinedrawa -  Ondine
Nathalie Cinedrawa
Pauline Le Roux
Julie Loudieres

Swimming

New Caledonia has qualified 27 athletes.

Men
Rudy Bernard
Romain Berthaud -  4 × 200 m Freestyle Relay
Thomas Chacun -  200m Butterfly,  50m Butterfly
Thomas Dahlia -  50m Freestyle,  100m Freestyle,  200m Breaststroke,  200m IM,  4 × 100 m Freestyle Relay,  4 × 200 m Freestyle Relay,  4x100 Medley Relay,  200m Freestyle,  100m Breaststroke,  50m Breaststroke
Julien-Pierre Goyetche -  4 × 100 m Freestyle Relay,  4x100 Medley Relay,  50m Backstroke,  100m Backstroke
Jean-Baptiste L'Huillier
Dylan Lavorel -  200m Backstroke,  4 × 100 m Medley Relay,  50m Backstroke,  100m Backstroke
Marcus Meozzi
Julien Monot
Benoit Riviere
Olivier Saminadin -  4 × 200 m Freestyle Relay,  400m Freestyle,  200m IM,  400m IM
Bryan Spitz -  4 × 100 m Freestyle Relay
David Thevenot -  4 × 100 m Freestyle Relay,  4x100 Medley Relay,  50m Butterfly,   100m Butterfly,  50m Freestyle,  100m Freestyle
Damon Theveny -  5 km Open Water
Hugo Tormento -  400m Freestyle,  1500m Freestyle,  200m Butterfly,  400m IM,  4 × 200 m Freestyle Relay,  5 km Open Water,  200m Backstroke,  200m Freestyle
Jeremy Verlaguet -  1500m Freestyle

Women
Suzanne Afchain -  4 × 100 m Freestyle Relay,  4 × 200 m Freestyle Relay,  200m Backstroke,  50m Backstroke
Maroma Bong
Dephine Bui Duyet -  400m IM,  100m Backstroke
Diane Bui Duyet -  50m Butterfly,  100m Butterfly,  4 × 100 m Freestyle Relay,  4x100 Medley Relay
Laurene Gosse -  200m Butterfly
Lara Grangeon -  100m Freestyle,  200m Freestyle,  400m Freestyle,  800m Freestyle,  50m Backstroke,  100m Backstroke,  200m Backstroke,  100m Breaststroke,  200m Breaststroke,  200m Butterfly,  200m IM,  400m IM,  4 × 100 m Freestyle Relay,  4 × 200 m Freestyle Relay,  4 × 100 m Medley Relay,  5 km Open Water,  50m Breaststroke,  50m Butterfly,  100m Butterfly,  50m Freestyle
Armelle Hidrio -  50m Freestyle,  4 × 100 m Freestyle Relay,  4 × 200 m Freestyle Relay,  4 × 100 m Medley Relay,  100m Freestyle,  200m IM
Maeva Parayre
Charlotte Robin -  4 × 200 m Freestyle Relay,  400m Freestyle,  800m Freestyle,  5 km Open Water
Lauriane Santa
Adeline Williams -  50m Breaststroke,  4 × 100 m Medley Relay,  100m Breaststroke,  200m Breaststroke

Table Tennis

New Caledonia has qualified 10 athletes.

Men
Olivier Bilon -  Team Tournament
Jeremy Dey -  Team Tournament
Stephane Gilabert -  Double Tournament,  Team Tournament
Jeremy Lao -  Team Tournament
Laurent Sens -  Double Tournament,  Team Tournament,  Single Tournament,  Mixed Double Tournament

Women
Ornella Bouteille -  Double Tournament,  Single Tournament,  Team Tournament,  Mixed Double Tournament
Fleur Dumortier -  Team Tournament,  Single Tournament,  Double Tournament
Alexandra Heraclide -  Single Tournament,  Double Tournament,  Team Tournament
Fabianna Faehau -  Team Tournament
Lea Lai Van -  Team Tournament,  Double Tournament

Taekwondo

New Caledonia has qualified 14 athletes.

Men
Emerick Dubois -  -54 kg,  Team Tournament
Vincent Roubio -  -63 kg,  Team Tournament
Stephane Ouazana -  -74 kg
John Trouillet -  Team Tournament,  -87 kg
Anthony Rondeau
Axel Raymond -  -68 kg
Jeremy Wiard -  -80 kg
Karel Orthosie -  Team Tournament,  87 kg & Over

Women
Lindsay Gavin -  -53 kg
Meryl Monawa -  -62 kg
Alana Peraldi -  -73 kg
Jenny Dabin -  -49 kg
Lenka Folcher -  -57 kg
Doriane Gohe -  -67 kg

Tennis

New Caledonia has qualified 8 athletes.

Men
Maxime Chazal -  Mixed Double Tournament,  Team Tournament,  Double Tournament
Nickolas N’Godrela -  Single Tournament,  Team Tournament,  Double Tournament
Loic Perret -  Team Tournament
Pierre-henri Guillaume -  Team Tournament

Women
Stephanie Di Luccio -  Team Tournament
Anaeve Pain -  Mixed Double Tournament,  Team Tournament,  Single Tournament,  Double Tournament
Élodie Rogge -  Single Tournament,  Team Tournament,  Double Tournament
Meryl Pydo -  Team Tournament

Triathlon

New Caledonia has qualified 6 athletes.

Men
Audric Lucini -  Mixed Team Sprint,  Sprint
Thomas Testet
Patrick Vernay -  Sprint,  Mixed Team Sprint

Women
Erika Ellis
Catherine Grangeon
Sarah Laran -  Mixed Team Sprint,  Sprint

Volleyball

Beach Volleyball

New Caledonia has qualified a men's and women's team.  Each team can consist of a maximum of 2 members.

Men -  Team Tournament
Frantz Gouzenes
Yvannick Iwa

Women -  Team Tournament
Sulita Malivao
Sylvie Mero

Indoor Volleyball

New Caledonia has qualified a men's and women's team.  Each team can consist of a maximum of 12 members.

Men
Jean-Patrick Iwa
Elysee Weneguei
Francky Martin
Franck Citre
Jacques Xenihate
Christopher Suve
Marc Phadom
Quincy Manuopuava
Maoni Talia
Morten Kalemhu
Louis Totele
Jacques Wainebengo

Women -  Team Tournament
Sonia Hoija
Adele Menango
Elisabeth Gope-Fenepej
Cyrillia Atrea
Germaine Manmieu
Sarah Nehoune
Moone Armonie Kohnu
Aurelie Kohnu
Emeline Haeko
Rose Marie Vakie
Esthera Wowene
Alexia Wanabo

Weightlifting

New Caledonia has qualified 2 athletes.

Women
Stephanie Tiemonhou
Lydie Tiemonhou -  -63 kg Clean & Jerk,  -63 kg Snatch,  -63 kg Total

References

Sources

2011 in New Caledonian sport
Nations at the 2011 Pacific Games
New Caledonia at the Pacific Games